The Bondman is a 1929 British silent adventure directed by Herbert Wilcox and starring Norman Kerry, Frances Cuyler, and Donald Macardle. It was based on the 1890 novel The Bondman by Hall Caine.

The film was made at Cricklewood Studios. Because it was made as a silent film at a time when sound film was taking over it was only able to secure release as a second feature.

Hall Caine enjoyed the final film.

Cast
 Norman Kerry as Jason 
 Frances Cuyler as Greeba Fairbrother 
 Donald Macardle as Michael 
 Henry Vibart as Father Ferrati 
 Harold Saxon-Snell as Testa 
 Judd Green as Adam Fairbrother 
 Florence Vie as Mrs. Fairbrother 
 Edward O'Neill as Father 
 Dora Barton as Mother 
 Charles Emerald as Captain

See also
The Bondman (1916)
The Red Samson (1917)

References

Bibliography
 Chibnall, Steve. Quota Quickies: The Birth of the British 'B' Film. British Film Institute, 2007.
 Wood, Linda. British Films, 1927-1939. British Film Institute, 1986.

External links

1929 films
1920s historical adventure films
British historical adventure films
British silent feature films
1920s English-language films
Films directed by Herbert Wilcox
Films shot at Cricklewood Studios
Films based on British novels
Films set in the 19th century
British black-and-white films
British and Dominions Studios films
1920s British films
Silent historical adventure films